Peter Conacher may refer to:
Pete Conacher (born 1932), retired ice hockey player
for the UK pipe-organ builder, Peter Conacher (1823–1894), see Conacher and Co